John Alexander (November 29, 1897 – July 13, 1982) was an American stage, film, and television actor.

Early life
He was born on November 29, 1897, in Newport, Kentucky. His father owned steamboats and his mother was a telegraph operator.

Career
He had career spanning more than 55 years on Broadway with his first role as the title character in Elmer Brown, the Only Boy in Town in 1908/1909.

He is best remembered for his performance as Teddy Brewster, a lunatic who thinks he is Theodore Roosevelt, in the 1944 classic film Arsenic and Old Lace opposite Cary Grant. He had previously portrayed that role in the 1941 Broadway play of the same name on which the film was based. He went on to play the "real" Roosevelt in the 1950 Bob Hope comedy Fancy Pants and reprised his role as Teddy "Roosevelt" Brewster in the 1955 TV adaptation of Arsenic and Old Lace in the anthology series The Best of Broadway.

Among his other notable film roles, Alexander played Steve Edwards in A Tree Grows in Brooklyn in 1945, Mr. McComber in Summer Holiday in 1948, Jack Riker in Winchester '73 in 1950 and Howard Shipley in The Marrying Kind in 1952.

During the 1950s and early 1960, he guest starred on television series, such as The Phil Silvers Show, Adventures of the Sea Hawk and Car 54, Where Are You? Alexander's last performance was as Mayor Crane in the Broadway comedy Never Too Late, a role he had played since 1962.

Alexander died on July 13, 1982 in New York City. He is buried in the Actors Fund of America plot in Kensico Cemetery in Valhalla, New York.

Partial filmography

Baby Take a Bow (1934) - Ragpicker (uncredited)
 The Ghost Rider (1935) - Sheriff
The Arizonian (1935) - Billy (uncredited)
Special Agent (1935) - Arcade Manager (uncredited)
Polo Joe (1936) - William the Waiter (uncredited)
On Such a Night (1937) - District Attorney
Flowing Gold (1940) - Sheriff
Calling All Husbands (1940) - Sheriff Ben Barnes
Mr. Skeffington (1944) - Jim Conderley
The Doughgirls (1944) - Warren Buckley
Arsenic and Old Lace (1944) - 'Teddy Roosevelt' Brewster
A Tree Grows in Brooklyn (1945) - Steve Edwards
The Horn Blows at Midnight (1945) - First Trumpeter / Doremus
Junior Miss (1945) - J. B. Curtis
It Shouldn't Happen to a Dog (1946) - Joe Parelli
The Jolson Story (1946) - Lew Dockstader
New Orleans (1947) - Colonel McArdle
Living in a Big Way (1947) - Attorney Ambridge
Cass Timberlane (1947) - Dr. Roy Drover
Where There's Life (1947) - Mr. Herbert Jones
Summer Holiday (1948) - Mr. Dave McComber
Night Has a Thousand Eyes (1948) - Mr. Gilman
Winchester '73 (1950) - Jack Riker
Fancy Pants (1950) - Teddy Roosevelt
The Sleeping City (1950) - Police Insp. Gordon
The Model and the Marriage Broker (1951) - Mr. Perry
The Marrying Kind (1952) - Howard Shipley
Untamed Frontier (1952) - Max Wickersham
The Mugger (1958) - Chief of Police
The Man in the Net (1959) - Mr. Carey
One Foot in Hell (1960) - Sam Giller - Storekeeper
The Right Man (1960 TV movie) - Wendell Mike

References

External links
 
 
 
 
 John Alexander ephemera, 1916-1982, held by the Billy Rose Theatre Division,  New York Public Library for the Performing Arts

1897 births
1982 deaths
20th-century American male actors
American male film actors
American male stage actors
American male television actors
Burials at Kensico Cemetery
Male actors from Kentucky
People from Newport, Kentucky